The 2017 Ballon d'Or was the 62nd annual award recognising the best male footballer in the world for 2017. 

Cristiano Ronaldo won the award for the fifth time on 7 December 2017, equalling the highest tally of Ballons d'Or in history at the time, sharing the record with Lionel Messi.

Rankings
The 30 nominees for the award were announced on 9 October 2017. The winner was announced on 7 December 2017.

References 

2017
2017 in association football
2017 sports awards